Andrew's hill rat (Bunomys andrewsi) is a species of rodent in the family Muridae. It is found only in Sulawesi and Buton Island, Indonesia.

References

Bunomys
Rodents of Sulawesi
Mammals described in 1911
Taxonomy articles created by Polbot